41 and 42 The Shambles is a historic building in the city centre of York, in England.

The building was constructed in the late 15th century, as a three-storey timber framed building on The Shambles.  The upper storeys are jettied on both the Shambles and Little Shambles fronts.  The ground floor was later rebuilt in brick, and the upper floors are rendered.  Inside, the timber frame survives intact, including a crown post roof.

The building was restored in 1950, and continues to serve as a shop and workshop.  It was Grade II* listed in 1954.

See also 

 1 Little Shambles, adjoining the building at the rear

References

41
Buildings and structures in North Yorkshire
15th-century establishments in England
Grade II* listed buildings in York
15th century in York
Timber framed buildings in Yorkshire